Vranište may refer to:
 Vranište, Struga, North Macedonia
 Vranište (Pirot), Serbia